Mauro Conochiari (born 29 August 1980 in Argentina) was an Argentine-Italian footballer who played for Defensores de Belgrano in Argentina's third division.

References

External links
 Primera División Argentina statistics
 BDFA profile

1980 births
Living people
Argentine footballers
Argentine expatriate footballers
Association football forwards
Newell's Old Boys footballers
Deportivo Morón footballers
Central Córdoba de Rosario footballers
Deportivo Italia players
UD Vecindario players
Defensores de Belgrano footballers
Expatriate footballers in Venezuela
Argentine expatriate sportspeople in Venezuela
Expatriate footballers in Italy
Argentine expatriate sportspeople in Italy
Expatriate footballers in Spain
Argentine expatriate sportspeople in Spain
Argentine Primera División players
People from Casilda
Sportspeople from Santa Fe Province